Matthew Kershaw is a Gemini Award  nominated television producer and film and television writer.  He is the co-creator and producer of the award-winning series At the End of My Leash. At the End of My Leash is known in the United States as In the Dog House and currently airs on ION, and previously aired on Animal Planet.

Awards
2012 AMPIA Award - Best Lifestyle Series for Puppy SOS
2010 AMPIA Award - Best Lifestyle Series for At the End of My Leash
2010 GOLDEN SHEAF Award Nomination (Yorkton Film Festival) - Best Lifestyle Series for At the End of My Leash
 2009 GOLDEN SHEAF Award (Yorkton Film Festival) - Best Lifestyle Series for At the End of My Leash
 2009 AMPIA Award Nomination - Best Lifestyle Series for At the End of My Leash
 2008 GEMINI Award Nomination - Best Lifestyle Series for At the End of My Leash
 2008 AMPIA Award - Best Lifestyle Series for At the End of My Leash
 2007 AMPIA Award Nomination - Best Reality Series for At the End of My Leash
 2006 AMPIA Award Nomination - Best Reality Series for Stepping In It
 1993 AMPIA Award Nomination - Best Student Project

References

External links

Canadian male screenwriters
Canadian television producers
Canadian television writers
Living people
Year of birth missing (living people)
20th-century Canadian screenwriters
20th-century Canadian male writers
21st-century Canadian screenwriters
21st-century Canadian male writers